is a 1969 Japanese drama film directed by Kinji Fukasaku.

Cast
Akihiro Miwa as Ryuko Fujio
Eitaro Ozawa as Kyohei Sako
Masakazu Tamura as Wataru
Ayako Hosho as Kyohei's Wife
Kō Nishimura as Otomo
Kikko Matsuoka as Reiko
Akira Jo as George
Ryōhei Uchida as Kazama
Yūsuke Kawazu as Tsugawa

Other credits
Art direction: Kumagai Masao
Written by:
Kinji Fukasaku
Hirō Matsuda
Yukio Mishima - play

Reception
Hayley Scanlon of windowsonworlds.com wrote that Black Rose Mansion is "drenched in gothic melodrama" but "also succeeds in being both fascinatingly intriguing and a whole lot of strange fun at the same time."

In the book Rising Sun, Divided Land: Japanese and South Korean Filmmakers, author Kate E. Taylor-Jones writes, "In his use of people and characters that deliberately challenge the dominant ideology of attempting to 'forget' the war, Fukasaku is a fore-runner of later directors such as Miike Takashi who would also use non-Japanese characters to make comments on the state of Japanese society."

References

External links 
 

1969 films
1969 drama films
Films about infidelity
Films about singers
Films based on works by Yukio Mishima
Films directed by Kinji Fukasaku
Films set in Kobe
Films set in Yokohama
Japanese drama films
Japanese films based on plays
1960s Japanese-language films
1960s Japanese films